Novo Selo (meaning "new village") is a small village in southern Bulgaria. It is located in Stamboliyski municipality in Plovdiv Province.

Novo Selo is located on the north slope of the Rhodope Mountains.

Villages in Plovdiv Province